This article discusses universities in Nazi Germany. In May 1933 books from university libraries which were deemed culturally destructive, mainly due to anti-National Socialist or Jewish themes or authors, were burned by the Deutsche Studentenschaft (German Student Union) in town squares, e.g. in Berlin, and the curricula were subsequently modified. Martin Heidegger became the rector (and later head) of Freiburg University, where he delivered a number of National Socialist speeches and for example promulgated the Führerprinzip at the University on August 21, 1933.

Well-known expelled professors
Albert Einstein
Max Born
Fritz Haber
Otto Fritz Meyerhof
Theodor W. Adorno
Martin Buber
Ernst Bloch
Max Horkheimer
Ernst Cassirer
Herbert Marcuse
Louis Hamilton, 1879-1948 (not Louis Kemppel Hamilton, 1890–1957)

Austrian universities
The University of Vienna participated in National Socialism. Eduard Pernkopf (rector 1943–1945) compiled a "Topographical Anatomy of the Human Species". Hans Sedlmayr, a declared National Socialist, led an art institute throughout the war.

Germanized universities

The first Reichsuniversität began operations in Prague on November 4, 1939.

The University of Poznań was closed by the German Occupation in 1939, and reopened on April 27, 1941 as Reichsuniversität Posen, a Grenzlanduniversität aligned with Nazi ideology. Its faculty included historian   and anatomist Hermann Voss. The German university ceased operations in 1944, and the University of Poznań reopened in 1945.

The University of Strasbourg was transferred to Clermont-Ferrand in 1939 and Reichsuniversität Straßburg existed from November 23, 1941 until the Allied recapture of the city in 1944. It was notably the site of medical experimentation on and murder of Jews and other concentration camp inmates led by the Dean of the Medical School, August Hirt.

See also
German Student Union
National Socialist German Lecturers League
National Socialist German Students' League
Vow of allegiance of the Professors of the German Universities and High-Schools to Adolf Hitler and the National Socialistic State

References

Sources
 
 
When books burn (web exhibit). University of Arizona Library. 2006. Retrieved 2019-05-07.
Historiker im Nationalsozialismus... by Ingo Haar
Wechsler, Patrick (1991). La Faculté de Medecine de la „Reichsuniversität Straßburg“ (1941-1945) à l’heure nationale-socialiste , dissertation, University of Freiburg. Published online, 2005. Retrieved 2019-05-07. urn:nbn:de:bsz:25-freidok-18966
 Louis Hamilton, A British Scholar in Nazi Germany, 1933–1938, in Nigel Copsey (ed.), Journal of Comparative Fascist Studies, 2016.
Hentschel, Klaus (ed. 1996) Physics and National Socialism. An Anthology of Primary Sources, Basel: Birkhäuser 1996. 
 Teresa Wróblewska: Die Reichsuniversitäten Posen, Prag und Strassburg als Modelle nationalsozialistischer Hochschulen in den von Deutschland besetzten Gebieten, Marszalek, Toruń 2000. 
 “Louis Hamilton, a British academic and Canada specialist in Germany”, in William Keel (ed.), Yearbook of German-American Studies, 2008.

Education in Nazi Germany
Higher education in Germany
History of universities